OTHS may refer to:

Oakville Trafalgar High School
Obra D. Tompkins High School
O'Fallon Township High School
Osgoode Township High School
Ottawa Technical High School
Ottawa Township High School
Northern Valley Regional High School at Old Tappan